Changsha County is a county in Hunan Province, China. It is under the administration of the prefecture-level city of Changsha. Located in the west portion of Changsha, the county is bordered to the north by Miluo City and Pingjiang County, to the west by Wangcheng, Kaifu and Furong Districts, to the southwest by Yuhua District, and to the southeast and the east by Liuyang City. As of 2015 it has a registered population of 743,000 and a permanent resident population of 916,000. The county has 5 subdistricts and 13 towns under its jurisdiction. The county seat is Xingsha Subdistrict.

History
The origin of the name "Changsha" is lost in antiquity. The name first appeared known in the Yi Zhou Shu in the 11 century BCE during the reign of King Cheng of the Zhou dynasty. A vassal lord from the Changsha area sent a type of softshell turtle known as "Changsha softshell turtle" to the Zhou king as a tribute. The present Changsha County was parts of the historic Qianzhong Commandery of Chu state in late Warring States period (481 BC to 221 BC) and the historic Xiang County in Qin dynasty (221 BC–206 BC). During the Han dynasty (206 BC – 220 AD), Xiang County was renamed Linxiang County. Changsha County was formally established with the replacement of the Linxiang County, concurrent with the establishment of the Sui dynasty. Shanhua County was formed from 5 townships of Changsha County and 2 townships of Xiangtan County in 1098 AD during the Song dynasty. Changsha and Shanhua Counties were merged into modern day Changsha County in 1912.

Geography
Changsha County is located in the northern part of the Changsha-Hengyang Hilly Basin. It is located at the southern end of the Mufu Mountains, Lianyun Mountains and the branches of Dalong Mountain, and the northern edge of the Zhuzhou Uplift Belt. The mountains of Longhua and Wuchuan are in the east, Taojiapai and Tanpenpo mountains lie in the south, and the mountains of Yingzhu and Mingyue are in the northwest. The mountains of Xingyun and Piaofeng stand in the north. The Mingyue Mountain in Beishan Town is the highest peak with an elevation of 659 meters above sea level. The terrain gradually tilts from the north, east and south to the central and western regions, forming an irregular "dustpan" shape. There are seven types of rock layers in metamorphic rocks, glutenite, limestone, red rock, laterite, sand shale and granite. It is divided into five types of landforms: hillocks, plains, mountains, hills and waters, mainly hillocks and plains.

The county is rich in mineral resources. After exploration, it has been found that tungsten, tin, nickel, antimony, bismuth, antimony, cobalt, molybdenum, copper, lead and zinc, gold, silicon, coal, kaolin, limestone, fluorite, granite, monazite sand Wait for more than 20 minerals. 113 mineral deposits have been discovered, including 1 large deposit, 4 medium, 62 small, and 46 minerals. The non-metallic minerals such as brick clay, silica, quartz sand and building stone related to building materials have been exploited, accounting for 80% of all mineral deposits. Most of the other minerals have not been exploited due to their small scale. The mineral resources in the territory are mainly non-metallic minerals such as granite, kaolin and shale for brick and tile. The metal mines are mostly small and mineralized.

The northwestern part of the county, Beishan-Qingshanpu-Fulin Towns, is a widely developed granite, which is an important producer of granite minerals in the county; The resources of kaolinite in Dinggong and Fulin are abundant. The vast areas of Chunhua, Huanghua, Huangxing, Ganshan and Jiangbei in the central part are sand and shale development areas, which are the main shale mining areas in the territory. Jiangbei and other places in the southeastern part have limestone output. Tungsten, gold and polymetallic deposits in the middle and low mountainous areas at the junction of the northern part of the territory and Pingjiang County. There is underground hot water resources found in Malinqiao of Lukou Town.

There are 10 species of mammals, 48 species of birds and more than 10 species of snakes in the county. Among them, pangolin, civet, monkey face eagle, white pheasant and tiger frog are national second-class protected animals. There are more than 120 kinds of wild medicinal plants and more than 80 kinds of woody plants. Among them, Ginkgo biloba, Eucommia ulmoides and Fujian cypress are national secondary protected plants, and Metasequoia is a provincial first-class protected plant.

"Luodai Black Pig" is a national geographical indication protection product, "Jinjing" and "Xiangfeng" teas are "China Famous Brands".

The county's forest coverage rate is 43.74%, the forest greening rate is 49.83%, and the total forest accumulation is 4.185 million cubic meters.

Climate

Economy
Changsha County is the most developed county in Central China ranking 8th in the Top 100 of counties and county-level cities of China by comprehensive strength in 2020. Changsha County is one of the best developed manufacturing counties and county-level cities in the province, the manufacturing industry is its economic pillar. Changsha's manufacturing engines are construction machinery, automobile and parts, electronics and information. For 2015, the gross domestic product of Changsha County was CN￥116.83 billion (US$18.76 billion), Of this total, the value added of the manufacturing industry was CN￥82.16 billion (US$13.19 billion), shares 70.32 percentage of its GDP. Changsha County is home of the Sany (三一集团), Sunward (山河智能), Broad (远大空调), Zoomlion (中联重科) and forest and paper (泰格林纸) companies.

According to preliminary accounting of the statistical authority, the gross domestic product of Changsha County in 2017 was 143,110 million yuan (21,196 million US dollars), up by 11.3 percent over the previous year. Of this total, the value added of the primary industry was 7,590 million yuan (1,124 million US dollars), up by 3.1 percent, that of the secondary industry was 91,800 million yuan (13,596 million US dollars), up by 11.6 percent and that of the tertiary industry was 43,720 million yuan (6,475 million US dollars), up by 12.1 percent. The value added of the primary industry accounted for 5.30 percent of the GDP; that of the secondary industry accounted for 64.15 percent; and that of the tertiary industry accounted for 30.55 percent. The per capita GDP in 2017 was 137,000 yuan (20,291 US dollars).

Subdivisions
According to the result on adjustment of township-level administrative divisions of Changhsha county on November 19, 2015, Changsha county has 5 subdistricts and 13 towns under its jurisdiction, they are:

5 subdistricts
 Changlong Subdistrict
 Langli, Changsha
 Quantang Subdistrict
 Xianglong Subdistrict
 Xingsha Subdistrict

13 towns
 Ansha, Changsha
 Beishan, Changsha
 Chunhua, Changsha
 Fulin
 Gaoqiao Town, Changsha
 Guoyuan, Changsha
 Huanghua, Changsha
 Huangxing, Changsha
 Jiangbei, Changsha
 Jinjing, Changsha
 Kaihui
 Lukou, Changsha
 Qingshanpu

References

 
County-level divisions of Changsha